Nagalama, whose correct phonetic spelling is Naggalama is a town in Uganda's Central Region.

Location

Population
As of May 2011, the exact population of Nagalama is not publicly known.

Landmarks
The landmarks within or near Nagalama include:

 The offices of Nagalama Town Council
 St. Francis Hospital Nagalama – a 100-bed community hospital, affiliated with the Roman Catholic Diocese of Lugazi
 Nagalama Central Market
 Nagalama Catholic Church
 St. Joseph's Primary School – A public, non-residential elementary school (Grades 1–7)
 St. Joseph's Senior Secondary School – A public non-residential middle and high school (Grades 8–13)
 The Kalagi-Kayunga Road – The all-weather tarmac road passes through Nagalama in a Northeast to Southwest direction.

External links
 St. Joseph's Secondary School Produces Some of the Best Students in Uganda

See also
 Mukono District
 Mukono
 Nakifuma
 Nagalama Hospital
 Central Region, Uganda

References

Populated places in Central Region, Uganda
Cities in the Great Rift Valley
Mukono District